The third and final season of Jem aired between February 2, 1988, and May 2, 1988, as first-run syndication in the United States.

Episodes

References

External links
 

1988 American television seasons